Instant Hotel is an Australian reality television series which began airing on the Seven Network on 7 November 2017. The series follows homeowners who have transformed their homes into hotels and are individually judged by each other to receive the highest scores with the winner to win an ultimate prize.

The series is produced by the creators of Seven reality shows My Kitchen Rules and House Rules and the first season was hosted by Luke Jacobz.

In November 2017, the series was renewed for a second season which aired in 2019. In December 2018, Seven announced Laurence Llewelyn-Bowen would replace Luke Jacobz as host in 2019. The second season aired on 11 February 2019. Netflix distributed the show internationally between 2018 and 2023.

Format changes

The first season contained two groups of five with the highest from each group going head to head in the grand final. The second season contained only four pairs of contestants with the highest two teams going head to head in the grand final.

The prize for the first season was an all-expense-paid stay at a Californian Instant Hotel. The prize for the second season was $100,000.

Series details

Season 1

Teams

Season One Details

Instant Hotel Rounds

Over two rounds, each team scored each other out of ten based on the house, location/nearby attractions, value for money, and quality of a good night's sleep. Series judge, Juliet Ashworth, also scored each team out of ten based on the quality of the house. In a twist, the hotel owners also scored the contestants overall on their stay as houseguests, which also went towards their final scores. The team that scored the highest at the end of each round went to the Grand Final.

Round 1
 Episodes 1 to 5
 Air date — 7 to 14 November 
 Description — The first of the two instant hotel groups are introduced into the competition in Round 1. The highest scoring team at the end of this round will go through to Grand Final.

Round 2
 Episodes 6 to 10
 Air date — 15 to 27 November 
 Description — The second of the two instant hotel groups are introduced into the competition in Round 2. The highest scoring team at the end of this round will go through to Grand Final.

Grand Final

 Episodes 11 & 12
 Air date — 28 to 29 November 
 Description — Four eliminated contestants (two from each round) and the opposite grand finalist each stay at the house of one of the grand finalist. Each grand finalist made changes to their homes based on the comments from contestants in their round. The teams voted as a group on each criterion, being the value for money (VFM), location (L), night's sleep (NS), and the house (H). Juliet however did not score of night's sleep, instead scoring on how well they changed their home (CTH). The team that scored the highest were announced as the winners and received an all-expense-paid stay at an instant hotel in California.

Ratings

Season 2

Teams

Season 2 Details

Season two followed a similar format as last time with each team scoring each other out of ten based on the house, location/nearby attractions, value for money, and quality of a good night's sleep. It saw the return of season one judge Juliet Ashworth, as well as a new additional judge,  Laurence Llewelyn-Bowen. Each judge also scored the team's house out of ten. The two teams that scored the highest faced off in the finals.

Round 1
 Episodes 1 to 5
 Air date — 7 to 14 November 
 Description — The first of the two instant hotel groups are introduced into the competition in Round 1. The highest scoring team at the end of this round will go through to Grand Final.

References

Seven Network original programming
2017 Australian television series debuts
2019 Australian television series endings
2010s Australian reality television series
English-language television shows